Masjid Hang Jebat (Jawi: مسجد هڠ جيبت) is a mosque  in Queenstown, Singapore. It is one of the few old-generation kampung mosques left in Singapore. The mosque was iconic for its close proximity to the former KTM railway tracks.

History
Located at the end of Jalan Hang Jebat, off Portsdown Avenue, Masjid Hang Jebat started as a surau in 1952 for Malay Regiment soldiers and Muslim workers in Wessex Estate. The mosque and its adjacent road took its name from the nearby Hang Jebat military installation which in turn was named after Hang Jebat, one of the legendary Malaccan warriors.

When the British withdraw in 1971, the land was opened up and donations were collected to expand to upgrade the institution. In 1973, it gained its status as a mosque.

Current Status
Today, the Mosque is managed by Majlis Ugama Islam Singapura. With the exception of minor upgrades and upkeeping, the mosque still retains its rustic kampung charm. It continues to play an important social role in the community by providing counselling, religious services and tuition classes.

The mosque is part of the Queenstown Heritage Trail.

Transportation
The mosque is accessible from Queenstown MRT station.

See also
My Queenstown Heritage Trail
List of mosques
Religion in Singapore
Islam in Singapore
List of mosques in Singapore

References

1952 establishments in Singapore
Mosques completed in 1952
Hang Jebat
Queenstown, Singapore
20th-century architecture in Singapore